Cadherin-8 is a protein that in humans is encoded by the CDH8 gene.

Function 

This gene encodes a type II classical cadherin from the cadherin superfamily, integral membrane proteins that mediate calcium-dependent cell-cell adhesion. Mature cadherin proteins are composed of a large N-terminal extracellular domain, a single membrane-spanning domain, and a small, highly conserved C-terminal cytoplasmic domain. The extracellular domain consists of 5 subdomains, each containing a cadherin motif, and appears to determine the specificity of the protein's homophilic cell adhesion activity. Type II (atypical) cadherins are defined based on their lack of a HAV cell adhesion recognition sequence specific to type I cadherins. This particular cadherin is expressed in brain and is putatively involved in synaptic adhesion, axon outgrowth and guidance.

Clinical significance 

Disruptions of CDH8 in humans have been implicated in autism.

References

Further reading

External links